An electrical junction is a point or area where multiple conductors or semiconductors make physical contact. Electrical junctions types include thermoelectricity junctions, metal–semiconductor junctions and p–n junctions. Junctions are either rectifying or non-rectifying. Non-rectifying junctions comprise ohmic contacts, which are characterised by a linear current–voltage relation. Electronic components employing rectifying junctions include p–n diodes, Schottky diodes and bipolar junction transistors.

See also 
 Break junction
 Depletion region, also called junction region
 Junction voltage
 Heterojunction
 Homojunction
 Josephson junction
 Nodal analysis
 p–n junction isolation

Electricity
Semiconductor structures